Anderson v. Stallone, 11 U.S.P.Q.2d 1161 (C.D. Cal. 1989) was a copyright infringement lawsuit against Sylvester Stallone, MGM, and other parties over a script for Stallone's film Rocky IV. This script written by Timothy Anderson was unsolicited and unauthorized, a key fact that led to a decision in favor of the defendants in the lower court and was later resolved in an out-of-court settlement during the pendency of plaintiff's appeal.

Introduction 
Timothy Burton Anderson, an author who wrote a script for the film Rocky IV, brought the suit for copyright infringement, unfair competition, unjust enrichment, and breach of confidence against Stallone, MGM, and other parties. Stallone et al. filed a motion for summary judgment which was granted in part and denied in part. Anderson appealed. The case was thereafter resolved in a confidential out-of-court settlement.

Case background  
In June 1982, after viewing the movie Rocky III, Anderson wrote a treatment for Rocky IV. According to Anderson's complaint filed with the court, in October 1982, Anderson met with Art Linkletter, a member of MGM's Board of Directors, at his Bel Air home; with Freddy Fields, then-president of MGM/UA  at his Culver City office; and also had meetings during the Summer of 1983 with then-Board Chairman Frank Yablans and MGM/UA Vice President Peter Bart. During the meetings, they discussed using Anderson's script for Rocky IV. Anderson claimed that MGM told him that if they used his script he would be paid a large sum of money. Anderson also met with Stallone in May 1983 at Stallone's Paramount Pictures office in a meeting arranged and attended by then-Deputy White House Chief of Staff Michael Deaver.

The case was argued before District Judge William D. Keller of the Central District of California. The Court concluded that the Defendants are entitled to their motion for summary judgment because Anderson's script is an infringing work not entitled to copyright protection.

The Court determined that the characters from the original movies were afforded copyright protection, using a standard borrowed from Judge Learned Hand in Nichols v. Universal Pictures Corp..  The key to the standard is that copyright protection is afforded when a character is developed with enough specificity to constitute protectable expression.

It was strikingly clear to the Court that Anderson's work was a derivative work; that under 17 U.S.C. section 106(2) derivative works are the exclusive privilege of the copyright holder (Stallone, in this case); and that since Anderson's work is unauthorized, no part of it can be given protection.

Anderson attempted to argue that Congressional history of 17 U.S.C. section 103(a) indicates that Congress intended non-infringing portions of derivative works to be protected.  The Court disagreed, citing legal scholarship (copyright law professors Melville and David Nimmer) and case law interpretations of 103(a).

See also 

 Copyright protection for fictional characters

References

External links
 Anderson v. Stallone, 11 U.S.P.Q.2d 1161 (C.D. Cal 1989)

1989 in United States case law
United States copyright case law
United States District Court for the Central District of California cases
Sylvester Stallone
Rocky (film series)
Copyright infringement of fictional characters